Pimestiku is a village in Narva-Jõesuu, Ida-Viru County in northeastern Estonia.

References

 

Villages in Ida-Viru County